Miss Teen USA 2021 was the 39th Miss Teen USA pageant, held on November 27, 2021, at the Paradise Cover Theater of River Spirit Casino Resort in Tulsa, Oklahoma. Ki'ilani Arruda of Hawaii crowned Breanna Myles of Florida as her successor at the end of the event. The competition was hosted by Kalani Hilliker and Nicole Adamo. 

For a fourth consecutive year, the competition was held concurrently alongside the Miss USA competition. The edition marked the first year of the competition under Crystle Stewart's directorship.

This was the first time since 1988 that the State Costume competition took place before the eve of preliminary competition.

Background
On December 31, 2020, it was announced on Good Morning America that Miss Teen USA and Miss USA would be split from the Miss Universe Organization into a new organization under the helm of Crystle Stewart. Stewart had previously been crowned Miss USA 2008.

Location
On May 18, 2021, it was confirmed by the Muscogee (Creek) Nation that Miss USA 2021 and Miss Teen USA 2021 would be held at the Paradise Cover Theater of River Spirit Casino Resort in Tulsa, Oklahoma. The competition will span five days, beginning on November 22 and concluding on November 27, 2021.

Impact of the COVID-19 pandemic

The COVID-19 pandemic impacted the schedule of Miss Teen USA 2020, postponing it from spring 2020 to November 2020. Each state organization had initially planned to schedule their 2021 pageants for the fall 2020 and winter 2020–21, the typical timeframe for state pageants dating back to the 1980s. However, most state pageants were later rescheduled to spring and summer 2021.

Due to restrictions implemented in all 50 states and the District of Columbia, numerous health and safety guidelines have been implemented for contestants, production members, and audiences at state pageants, such as taking a negative COVID-19 test and following social distancing. Additionally, a number of state pageants have had to alter their initial venue choices due to shut-downs implemented by their governor.

Selection of contestants
Delegates from 50 states and the District of Columbia will be selected in state pageants which began in September 2020. The first state pageants were Idaho and Montana, held together on their original dates of September 27, 2020 and the last state pageant was California on September 19, 2021.

Results

§ – Voted into Top 16 through the online vote.

Special awards

Order of Announcements

Top 16

Top 5

Pageant

Judges
Madison Brodsky – entertainment host and author
Claudia Correa – respiratory therapist
Chloe Lukasiak – dancer and Dance Moms star
Joni Rogers-Kante – CEO of SeneGence
Jérôme LaMaar – fashion designer and creative director

Contestants 
All 51 state titleholders have been crowned.

Notes

References

External links 

 Miss Teen USA official website

Beauty pageants
2021
November 2021 events in the United States
2021 beauty pageants
Beauty pageants in the United States
2021 in Oklahoma